Oeneis bore, the white-veined Arctic or Arctic grayling, is a butterfly, a species of Satyrinae that occurs in North America and Asia.

Description
The wingspan is 37 to 49 mm. The dorsal view is a dull greyish brown while the females are often tawny. Males have a dark grey node in the centre of the forewing.

Subspecies
Listed alphabetically:
O. b. arasaguna Austaut, 1911 – eastern Sayan, Transbaikalia?
O. b. bore – Arctic Europe, Arctic Siberia
O. b. edwardsi dos Passos, 1949 – southern Alberta, southern British Columbia, Montana, Wyoming, Colorado
O. b. fordi dos Passos, 1949 – south western Alaska
O. b. gaspeensis dos Passos, 1949 – southern Quebec
O. b. hanburyi Watkins, 1928 – Yukon, Northwest Territories, British Columbia, northern Manitoba
O. b. mckinleyensis dos Passos, 1949 – Alaska
O. b. pansa Christoph, 1893 – Yakutia, Magadan
?O. b. patrushevae Korshunov, 1985 - Siberian tundra
O. b. taygete Geyer, [1830] – Labrador, northern Quebec – white-veined Arctic

Similar species
 Melissa Arctic (O. mellisa)
 Polixenes Arctic (O. polixenes)

Range and habitat
Occurs from Lapland and northern Russia and across Arctic Canada from Labrador to British Columbia; also found in the Gaspe Peninsula, western Alberta and the US Rocky Mountain states. Its habitats include grassy alpine slopes, tundra, taiga, and subarctic bogs.

Larval foods
Sedges (e.g., Carex misandra) and oviposition has been observed on dead leaves of grasses (Festuca mibra, Festuca brachyphylla, and Festuca vivipara).

Adult foods
 Nectar

References

Butterflies of North America
Butterflies of Asia
Oeneis
Butterflies described in 1792